The World is a Vampire: NWA vs. AAA was a professional wrestling supercard co-promoted by the American-based National Wrestling Alliance (NWA) promotion and the Mexican Lucha Libre AAA Worldwide (AAA) promotion. Held as part of the NWA Pop-Up Event series, the event took place on March 4, 2023 at Foro Sol in Iztacalco, Mexico City, Mexico during The World is a Vampire music festival organized by The Smashing Pumpkins band. The event marked the first collaborative event held by the NWA and AAA.

In the main event, Tyrus defeated Daga to retain the NWA Worlds Heavyweight Championship. In other prominent matches, Kerry Morton defeated Sal the Pal and Jack Cartwheel in a three-way match to retain the NWA World Junior Heavyweight Championship, Nueva Generación Dinamita (El Cuatrero, Sansón, and Forastero) defeated Thom Latimer, Chris Masters, and Kratos to retain the AAA World Trios Championship, and La Rebelión (Bestia 666 and Mecha Wolf 450) defeated Vampiro and Blue Demon Jr. to retain the NWA World Tag Team Championship.

Production

Background
In August 2021, the American-based National Wrestling Alliance (NWA) promotion announced a working relationship with Mexico's Lucha Libre AAA Worldwide (AAA), with AAA wrestlers making appearances at NWA EmPowerrr and the NWA 73rd Anniversary Show. On March 31, 2022, at AAA Invades WrestleCon, La Rebelión (Bestia 666 and Mecha Wolf 450) successfully defended their NWA World Tag Team Championship against Aero Star and Drago, marking the first time a NWA title was defended during a AAA event.

On November 23, 2022, the NWA officially announced The World is a Vampire: NWA vs. AAA, the first collaborative event promoted by the NWA and AAA. The event will be held on March 4, 2023 at Foro Sol in Iztacalco, Mexico City, Mexico as part of The World is a Vampire music festival organized by The Smashing Pumpkins, of which NWA President Billy Corgan is a member.

Storylines
The World is a Vampire: NWA vs. AAA featured eight professional wrestling matches, with different wrestlers involved in pre-existing scripted feuds, plots and storylines. Wrestlers portrayed either heels (referred to as rudos in Mexico, those that portray the "bad guys") or faces (técnicos in Mexico, the "good guy" characters) as they engaged in a series of tension-building events, which culminated in a wrestling match.

Results

See also
2023 in professional wrestling

References

2023 in professional wrestling
March 2023 events in Mexico
2023 in Mexico
The Smashing Pumpkins